Hafsat Olaronke Abiola-Costello (born 21 August 1974) in Lagos, is a Nigerian human rights, civil rights and democracy activist, founder of the Kudirat Initiative for Democracy (KIND), which seeks to strengthen civil society and promote democracy in Nigeria. She is President of Women In Africa Initiative (WIA), international platform for the economic development and support of African women entrepreneurs. She is also one of the founders of Connected Women Leaders (CWL).

Early life and education
Abiola-Costello is the eighth child of Nigeria's uninaugurated president-elect, the late Chief Moshood Abiola and late Kudirat Abiola. Her father, Moshood Abiola, was put in prison by the dictator Gen. Sani Abacha for treason after declaring himself president. The elder Abiola later died while in detention in 1998. While her mother was murdered during a demonstration for the release of her husband in 1996. In June 2018, President Muhammadu Buhari bestowed the title of Grand Commander of the Federal Republic (GCFR) on her father, late Chief Moshood Abiola, the supposed winner of the presidential election on June 12, 1993.

Abiola-Costello studied at Queens College, Yaba, Lagos and then Phillips Academy, Andover, Massachusetts  where she graduated in 1992. She then studied for degree in Development Economics receiving a degree from Harvard College in 1996, and later earned her M.Sc. in International Development from Tsinghua University, Beijing.

Career

Kudirat Initiative for Democracy (KIND) 
In honour of her mother's death, she founded KIND in 1997 with the aim of promoting the development of women as initiators of change through leadership and awareness programs. She is currently board president.

KIND is among the major organization that demanded for the reconsideration of the gender bill rejected by National Assembly of Nigeria (NASS). A bill seeking the amendment of the section 26 (2a) of the Nigerian 1999 constitution; if passed, foreigners married to Nigerian women will be able to apply for Nigerian citizenship. The bill is also pushing for at least 35% of political party and appointive positions at the federal and state levels be filled by women, as well as many other issues related to women's rights.

Later works 
In 2009, Abiola-Costello founded China-Africa Bridge and China Africa Forum, which promotes mutually beneficial cross-cultural collaboration between China and Africa, with a specific eye on women's contributions to the economy.

In 2006 she raised funds by organising performances of The Vagina Monologues in Nigeria.

Since May 2008, she is also a Councillor at the World Future Council among 49 other well known personalities.

Abiola-Costello is an advisory council member at the Fetzer Institute as well as the Nuclear Age Peace Foundation.

In July 2011, she was appointed the Special Adviser to the Governor of Ogun State with responsibility for achieving the Millennium Development Goals.

In 2016, she was re-appointed Special Adviser to Governor Ibikunle Amosun in Ogun State

Personal life 
In 2001 she married British economist and diplomat Nicholas Costello. They have 2 children, Khalil and Anabella.

Awards and recognition 

In 2000, Abiola was honoured as a Global Leader of Tomorrow at the World Economic Forum in Davos, Switzerland. In 2003, she was elected as a Fellow of the Ashoka: Innovators for the Public in recognition of her international status as a social entrepreneur. In 2006 she was nominated to be a founding councillor at the World Future Council

A 2014 documentary, "The Supreme Price" details the story of Hafsat Abiola and how both her parents paid a terrible cost in their quest for a better, freer Nigeria. It was directed by Joanna Lipper, a lecturer at Harvard University, who tells the story from Hafsat's perspective. The documentary also includes interviews with Walter Carrington, former U.S. ambassador to Nigeria, and Nobel Prize-winning writer Wole Soyinka.

In 2015 she was chosen to be one of 21 women who met for a conference at Harvard University Kennedy School of Government funded by Hunt Alternatives. The group included Judy Thongori from Kenya, Fauzia Nasreen from Pakistan and Olufunke Baruwa, Esther Ibanga and Ayisha Osori also from Nigeria. Some of her other awards and recognitions include:
Youth Peace and Justice Award of the Cambridge Peace Commission, 1997
State of the World Forum Changemaker Award, 1998
Woman to Watch for Award, 1999
Global Leader of Tomorrow Award, World Economic Forum, 2000
Nuclear Age Peace Foundation Global Award, 2001
Seeking Common Ground Award, 2007
Andover Alumni Award of Distinction, 2013
Goi Peace Award, 2016
Foreign Policy Diplomat of the Year Award, 2016
National Civil Rights Museum’s Freedom Award, 2019

See also 

 Hasfat Abiola (oral history and transcript), Georgetown Institute for Women, Peace and Security
 Equipping entrepreneurs for survival and success in post-pandemic Africa (interview with Dr. Ngozi Okonjo-Iweala)
 Africa, China, and Women (essay) by Hafsat Abiola
 Nigeria's Orphan (profile), Time magazine (1998)

Notes

External links

KIND
WIA Initiative 
Ashoka Fellow (2003)

Nigerian democracy activists
Nigerian human rights activists
Phillips Academy alumni
1974 births
Living people
Harvard College alumni
People from Lagos
Nigerian women activists
Yoruba women activists
Hafsat
Nigerian expatriates in the United States
Ashoka Fellows
Residents of Lagos